Kilaguni is a location in Kenya.

Location
Kilaguni is a location in Tsavo West National Park, Taita-Taveta County, in southeastern Kenya, close to the International border with the Republic of Tanzania.

Overview
It is the location of Kilaguni Lodge, a private hospitality establishment. A road from here (C103-West) leads west
The location is also served by Kilaguni Airport.

Population
The entire Tsavo West National Park, where Kilaguni is located, had a total human population of 2,733 according to the 1999 Kenya National Census conducted that year. No further details are available about the population of Kilaguni.

External links

  Location of Kilaguni At Google Maps

See also
Kilaguni Airport
Tsavo West National Park

References

Taita-Taveta County
Tsavo National Park
Coast Province